In the system of Aristotelian logic, the logical cube is a diagram representing the different ways in which each of the eight propositions of the system is logically related ('opposed') to each of the others.  The system is also useful in the analysis of syllogistic logic, serving to identify the allowed logical conversions from one type to another.

See also
Logical hexagon
Octagon of Prophecies
Square of opposition
Triangle of opposition

References

Conceptual models
Term logic